May is a former settlement in Amador County, California. It was located about 1 mile (1.6 km) north of Carbondale, at an elevation of 223 feet (68 m). A post office operated at May from 1881 to 1920.

References

Former settlements in Amador County, California
Former populated places in California